Felipe Ariel Yáñez Parra (born 18 October 2004) is a Chilean professional footballer who plays as a left-back for Chilean Primera División side Colo-Colo.

Club career
Yáñez came to Colo-Colo at the age of 8 and made his professional debut in the 2021 Primera División match against Audax Italiano on October 28, 2021. In 2022 he was loaned to Coquimbo Unido after having signed his first contract as a professional footballer with Colo-Colo.

International career
In April 2019, Yáñez took part of the Chile U15 squad at the UEFA U-16 Development Tournament in Finland. and also represented Chile at the 2019 South American U-15 Championship, playing all the matches. After being called up to training microcycles of Chile at under-17 and under-20 levels, in 2022 he represented Chile U20 in a friendly match against Paraguay U20.

Career statistics

Club

Notes

Personal life
He has stated that his football idol is Gary Medel.

References

External links
 
 Felipe Yáñez at playmakerstats.com (English version of ceroacero.es)

2004 births
Living people
Footballers from Santiago
Chilean footballers
Chile youth international footballers
Chile under-20 international footballers
Association football defenders
Colo-Colo footballers
Coquimbo Unido footballers
Chilean Primera División players